Ghost Peak is a  mountain summit located in British Columbia, Canada.

Description

Precipitation runoff from the mountain drains west to Arrow Lakes and north to the nearby Illecillewaet River via Greeley Creek. Ghost Peak is more notable for its steep rise above local terrain than for its absolute elevation. The mountain's toponym was officially adopted September 7, 1950, by the Geographical Names Board of Canada.

Climate

Based on the Köppen climate classification, Ghost Peak is located in a subarctic climate zone with cold, snowy winters, and mild summers. Winter temperatures can drop below −20 °C with wind chill factors below −30 °C.

See also

Geography of British Columbia

Gallery

References

External links
 Ghost Peak: Weather forecast

Two-thousanders of British Columbia
Selkirk Mountains
Columbia Country
Kootenay Land District